The National Vital Statistics System (NVSS) is an inter-governmental system of sharing data on the vital statistics of the population of the United States. It involves coordination between the different state health departments of the US states and the National Center for Health Statistics, a division of the Centers for Disease Control and Prevention.

Data and publications

The National Vital Statistics System includes the following data sets and publications:

 Vital Statistics of the United States: The data set goes back to 1890.
 National Vital Statistics Report: This is a monthly report that goes back to January 1998. The earlier version of this report, called the Monthly Vital Statistics Report, goes back to July 1964.
 Other reports

All data is accessible online on the NVSS website.

Related programs

The following programs are related to the National Vital Statistics System:

 Linked Birth and Infant Death Data Set
 National Survey of Family Growth
 Matched Multiple Birth Data Set
 National Death Index
 National Maternal and Infant Health Survey
 National Mortality Followback Survey

Reception and impact

Academic research

Data from the National Vital Statistics System has been cited in academic research on many topics, including births and homicides.

A 1995 paper by Weed for Population Index described the history of NVSS and how to prepare it for the next century.

Use as a standard source

Libraries and other link collections have pointed to the NVSS as an official data source for the vital statistics of the United States.

References

External links
 

Statistical organizations in the United States
Centers for Disease Control and Prevention
National statistical services
Federal Statistical System of the United States